The Batticaloa line is a railway line in Sri Lanka. Branching off the Northern line at Maho Junction, the line heads east through North Central Province and south-easterly through Eastern Province before terminating at the eastern city of Batticaloa. The line opened in 1928. There were no services on the Polonnaruwa-Batticaloa stretch of the line between 31 October 1996 and 12 April 2003 due to the civil war. The Udaya Devi service operates on the line.

Route definition

The Batticaloa line runs through the North Central and Eastern Provinces, connecting Mahawa (Maho Junction) on the Northern Line with the eastern city of Batticaloa.

The line runs east of Maho Junction towards Habarana.  At Habarana, the construction of a new line to connect to Kurunegala has been proposed in June 2013 to cut short journey times between Colombo and Batticaloa-line destinations.  East of Habarana, the Trincomalee Line diverges off the Batticaloa line at Gal Oya towards the port city of Trincomalee.  The Batticaloa line continues south-east towards Polonnaruwa before continuing to Batticaloa terminus.

History
The Batticaloa line opened in 1928, as a light railway.   Only locomotives with light axel loads were used on the line.

In the 1950s, the route was upgraded to support  broad gauge operation, under the administration of then CGR General Manager B. D. Rampala. Sharp curves and steep gradients were eased, as well as the change to heavier rails, to match the rest of the system.

Between 31 October 1996 and 12 April 2003, there were no services on the Polonnaruwa-Batticaloa stretch of the line, due to the civil war.

Operation
Sri Lanka Railways operates the Udaya Devi service on the Batticaloa line.  The service connects Colombo Fort with Batticaloa.

Railbus service is provided for local services without significant demand.  Railbus services allow SLR to meet local needs without stressing its limited rolling stock.

Infrastructure
The Batticaloa line is entirely single track, at  broad gauge.

The line is not electrified.  Regular services run on diesel power, including the railbus services.  The line currently operates on a lock-and-block signaling system.

See also

Sri Lanka Railways

References

Railway lines in Sri Lanka
Railway lines opened in 1928
Transport in Eastern Province, Sri Lanka
Transport in North Central Province, Sri Lanka
5 ft 6 in gauge railways in Sri Lanka